is a Japanese voice actress and singer. She is best known for her voice performances in anime, which include Alphonse Elric in the Fullmetal Alchemist series, Kiana in Honkai Impact 3rd, Kagura in Gin Tama, and Happy in Fairy Tail and Edens Zero. Because of her roles for characters such as Shana in Shakugan no Shana, Louise in The Familiar of Zero, Nagi Sanzenin in Hayate the Combat Butler, Taiga Aisaka in Toradora!, Aguri Madoka/Cure Ace in DokiDoki! PreCure, and Aria Holmes Kanzaki in Aria the Scarlet Ammo, some of her fans have nicknamed her the "Queen of Tsundere." She is currently represented by the talent agency I'm Enterprise.

She was nominated for Best Actress in Leading Role in the first Seiyu Awards for the role of Louise in The Familiar of Zero and for Best Actress in Supporting Role for the role of Kagura in Gintama, and jointly won Best Actress in a Supporting Role with Mitsuki Saiga at the second Seiyu Awards. Kugimiya won Best Actress in the third Seiyu Awards for the roles as Taiga Aisaka in Toradora! and her work in Nabari no Ou.

Career
In 1997, she earned her reputation from the company I'm Enterprise & We Flying Award at the first summer school of voice actors sponsored by Japan Narration Institute. Later, she became a member of I'm Enterprise.

In 1998, she debuted as a voice actress in the video game etude prologue -Shaking heart- as Tadami Saeki.

From the beginning of her debut, she plays the role of a teenage girl mainly from her childhood, using her voice quality. Later, she was appointed as a juvenile character, such as Taiki in Twelve Kingdoms and Alphonse Elric in Fullmetal Alchemist series, and began to take charge of various characters.

Kugimiya has also voiced several tsundere heroines, including Louise in The Familiar of Zero series, and Nagi Sanzenin in Hayate the Combat Butler. 
In 2008, she won for the Best Actresses in supporting roles at the 2nd Seiyu Awards. She won for the Best Actress in leading role at the 3rd Seiyu Awards. Within the Tamagotchi fandom she is known for her role in the Tamagotchi movies and anime as Mametchi. She has also contributed her voice to various merchandise such as Mugen Puchipuchi Moe, a virtual keychain bubble-wrap popping game.

She is also active on stage and participates in several stages and readings.

Filmography

Anime

Films

Drama CD

Video games

Dubbing

Tokusatsu

Live-action

Discography

Albums
 Kokohadoko (June 20, 2012)

Track list:
 "How I feel"
 
 "Foret Noire"
 
 "Wonder"
 

  (April 4, 2020)

Singles
 "Moete Koso Cosplay" (May 22, 2002) (with Sakura Nogawa, Saeko Chiba, Ai Shimizu, Akeno Watanabe and Chiaki Takahashi)
 "Kemeko Deluxe!" (October 29, 2008) (with Chiwa Saitō, Mikako Takahashi, Haruka Tomatsu, Ryoko Shiraishi, Ayako Kawasumi and Mai Goto)
 "Orange" (January 28, 2009) (Toradora! ending theme, with Yui Horie and Eri Kitamura)
 "Netsuretsu Kangei Wonderland" (May 27, 2009) (Saki ending theme, with Kana Ueda, Ami Koshimizu, Ryoko Shiraishi and Shizuka Itō)
 "Kimi e to Tsunagu Kokoro" (August 5, 2009) (Kanamemo opening theme, with Kaoru Mizuhara and Aki Toyosaki)
 "Karakoi ~Dakara Shoujo wa Koi wo Suru~" (September 9, 2009) (Titular song with Ryoko Shiraishi and "After Midnight" with Rie Tanaka)
 "buddy-body" (October 23, 2009) (Queen's Blade: Gyokuza wo Tsugu Mono ending theme, with Kanae Itō and Yūko Gotō)
 "LOVE × HEAVEN" (January 27, 2010) (Ladies versus Butlers! opening theme, with Mai Nakahara, Ami Koshimizu and Ayako Kawasumi)

References

External links
 
  
  
 

1979 births
Living people
Anime singers
I'm Enterprise voice actors
Japanese women pop singers
Japanese video game actresses
Japanese voice actresses
Lantis (company) artists
Voice actresses from Kumamoto Prefecture
Voice actresses from Osaka Prefecture
21st-century Japanese singers
21st-century Japanese women singers